"Hotter Than Fire" is a song by Swedish singer Eric Saade and American singer Dev. It is the first single from Saade's third album, Saade Vol. 2, and was first released on 2 November 2011 in Sweden. The song reached #5 in Sweden.

Background
"Hotter Than Fire" was written by Eric Saade, Jason Gill, Devin Tailes, and J-Son. The song was recorded in 2011.

The collaboration with Dev started after Saade saw the video of her single Bass Down Low. Dev heard an early demo of Hotter Than Fire and said immediately yes after they asked her if she wanted to join the song. About the song and the collaboration with Dev, Saade said: "It's a song that shows quite clearly where I am going. I love electro-pop and I feel like I'm in the middle of the development to begin to find what I want to do. When Dev wanted to sing on the song it became the icing on the cake. Her 'rap song' style was so perfect for the song. She made it sexy."

Other versions
Remixes of the song were released on 30 November 2011 in Sweden. The remixes are from Niclas Kings. A remixed version by LMC will be released as a single in the UK in 2012.

Critical reception
Idolator wrote that the song is "a blazing dance-pop jam" and compared it to Usher's "DJ Got Us Fallin' in Love".

Music video
The music video premiered on 7 December 2011. It was shot in one take and filmed on 19 November 2011 in Spain, Sweden and the United Kingdom. Dev, since pregnant, filmed her part in the United States.

Charts

Release history

References

External links

2011 singles
2011 songs
Eric Saade songs
Dev (singer) songs
All Around the World Productions singles
Eurodance songs
Songs written by Dev (singer)
Songs written by Eric Saade
Songs written by Jason Gill (musician)
Songs written by J-Son